The Nata River or Manzamnyama River is a natural watercourse in Southern Africa. It is an ephemeral river flowing in Zimbabwe and Botswana. It has a length of 330 km from its source to mouth, 210 km in Zimbabwe and 120 km in Botswana. Its total catchment area is 24,585 km2. The river originates in Sandown (S20.425036˚, E28.180660˚), a small farming town located on the Zimbabwean central watershed 50 km south west of Bulawayo and ends in the Makgadikgadi Pans (S20.348816˚, E26.240166˚) in Botswana. There is no outlet from the salt pans which can be considered as the “dead sea” of the south. The upper reaches of the river are located in a commercial farming area where good environmental and farming practices have resulted in the river experiencing very little siltation/sedimentation. Impressive sedimentation starts occurring about 65 km along the river course marking the beginning of a 90 km stretch in Zimbabwe where the river passes through communal farming areas. It is on this stretch where the sand-abstraction potential of the river is realised and communities rely on the sand river water for domestic, farming and livestock purposes.  Within the country of Botswana the Nata River is a source of water to the ephemeral wetlands of the Makgadikgadi Pans, where a number of species of limited distribution thrive. Specifically the Nata River discharges to Sua Pan, draining parts of eastern Botswana and southwestern Zimbabwe.

See also
 Nwetwe Pan
 Sua Pan

References
 Ann Hulsmans, Sofie Bracke, Kelle Moreau, Bruce J. Riddoch, Luc De Meester and Luc Brendonck, Dormant egg bank characteristics and hatching pattern of the Phallocryptus spinosa  (Anostraca) population in the Makgadikgadi Pans (Botswana), Hydrobiologia, Springer Netherlands, Volume 571, Number 1 / November, 2006  ISSN 0018-8158 (Print) 1573–5117, pages 123-132 
 Chris McIntyre (2008) Botswana: Okavango Delta, Chobe, Northern Kalahari, Bradt publishers, 502 pages

Line notes

Rivers of Botswana
Rivers of Zimbabwe
Makgadikgadi Pan